The 1977–78 season of the Moroccan Throne Cup is the 22nd edition of the competition.

Wydad Athletic Club won the cup,  beating Renaissance de Kénitra 3–0 in the final, played at the Stade Saniat Rmel in Tetouan. Wydad Athletic Club won the competition for the second time in their history.

Competition

Last 16

Quarter-finals

Semi-finals

Final 
The final took place between the winners of the two semi-finals, Wydad Athletic Club and Renaissance de Kénitra, on 16 July 1978 at Stade Saniat Rmel in Tanger.

Notes and references 

1977
1977 in association football
1978 in association football
1977–78 in Moroccan football